Volcanic plume or volcanic plume may refer to:

 Eruption plume, a column of hot volcanic ash and gas emitted into the atmosphere during an explosive volcanic eruption
 Mantle plume, an upwelling of abnormally hot rock within the Earth's mantle, which can cause volcanic hotspots